BYU Radio is a talk radio station run by Brigham Young University in Provo, Utah.

Operating at Sirius XM channel 143 (and in northern Utah on 107.9 KUMT and 89.1-2 KBYU-HD2), it is known on-air as BYU Radio. The station features "news, current events, sports, religious and scripted programming".

History
Prior to 2002, there was a satellite music format known as 'Bonneville International LDS Radio Network.' When Bonneville International decided to discontinue the format, the station was transferred under the direction of BYU. The university continued adding programming to the station.

BYU Radio launched as an internet radio station on August 1, 2002. The original format featured a selection of music by artists who were members of The Church of Jesus Christ of Latter-day Saints and alumni of Brigham Young University. A second stream, called BYU Radio Instrumental, launched in 2003. In 2008, a third stream, BYU Radio International, launched featuring Spanish- and Portuguese-language programming.

In 2006, KBYU-FM added a simulcast of BYU Radio on its HD Radio subchannel.

BYU Radio expanded its reach by finalizing an agreement with Dish Network to broadcast its programming on Channel 980. This is available to subscribers to the 'Top 120' or higher programming tier.

On July 1, 2011, BYU Radio expanded beyond inspirational music from the Church of Jesus Christ of Latter-day Saints and relaunched as a national talk-format station. BYU Radio began broadcasting on Sirius XM satellite radio, assigned to channel 143 on both the Sirius and XM lineup.

On October 17, 2011, BYU discontinued two of its Internet streams: BYU Radio International and BYU Radio Instrumental. The university said listeners would stream the music as background music causing high bandwidth costs for BYU. Those two services were not broadcast on Dish or SiriusXM, and were only available online.

On August 9, 2016, Greg Wrubell joined BYU as the Director of Broadcast Media. Among his responsibilities were moving BYU athletics flagship from KSL to BYU Radio and turning his coaches shows into a TV/radio simulcast for BYUtv and the Nu Skin BYU Sports Network radio affiliates. With his new responsibilities at BYU, Wrubell left KSL, though KSL remained part of the BYU Sports Networks affiliates. With the change, BYU Radio became the official flagship station for football, women's soccer, and men's basketball broadcasts. ESPN 960 remains the flagship carrier of women's soccer matches that conflict with football or men's basketball broadcasts.

On October 23, 2017, Brigham Young University announced that KBYU-FM would drop its classical music programming and become a full-time carrier of BYU Radio beginning June 30, 2018. However, on April 26, 2018, BYU backtracked on the plans following listener criticism of the planned flip, and announced its planned purchase of 107.9 KUMT to serve as a full-time outlet.

On June 21, 2021, Jeff Simpson became the new managing director of BYU Broadcasting, overseeing BYU Radio and TV. Previously, Simpson served as the president and publisher of the Deseret News and worked at both Walt Disney Pictures and Buena Vista Television.

Programming
The talk format reaches into Brigham Young University's depth of academic experts and topics. The station's slogan, "Together," reflects the station's mission to address the broad spectrum of listeners and their beliefs, bringing together all walks of life who have a desire to do good.

The station also carries inspirational programming, including BYU's campus devotionals live on Tuesdays, and Sunday programming consisting of audio from BYU Television programs and from the Church of Jesus Christ of Latter-day Saints, including the long-running radio program Music and the Spoken Word.

During the regular sports season, BYU Radio broadcasts live coverage of BYU football, women's soccer, and men's basketball games through the Nu Skin BYU Sports Network. The station also airs some BYU baseball (simulcast from ESPN 960) and airs some women's basketball games live.

The station streams online, and is also simulcast on TuneIn.

BYU Radio has multiple podcasts on air as well as on streaming platforms including Spotify, Apple Podcasts, and Google Podcasts. As of 2023, BYU Radio podcasts on air include The Lisa Show, Top of Mind with Julie Rose, The Apple Seed, Constant Wonder, and In Good Faith. All of these programs, in alignment with BYU's mission statement, are to provide uplifting and educational media.

References

External links
 

2002 establishments in Utah
Brigham Young University
Classical music radio stations in the United States

Mass media in Salt Lake City
Sirius XM Radio channels